The start of the Cambrian period is marked by 'fluctuations' in a number of geochemical records, including Strontium, Sulfur and Carbon isotopic excursions.  While these anomalies are difficult to interpret, a number of possibilities have been put forward.  They probably represent changes on a global scale, and as such may help to constrain possible causes of the Cambrian explosion.

The chemical signature may be related to continental break-up, the end of a "global glaciation", or a catastrophic drop in productivity caused by a mass extinction just before the beginning of the Cambrian.

Isotopes

Isotopes are different forms of elements; they have a different number of neutrons in the nucleus, meaning they have very similar chemical properties, but different mass.  The weight difference means that some isotopes are discriminated against in chemical processes – for example, plants find it easier to incorporate the lighter 12C than heavy 13C. Other isotopes are only produced as a result of the radioactive decay of other elements, such as 87Sr, the daughter isotope of 87Rb.  Rb, and therefore 87Sr, is common in the crust, so abundance of 87Sr in a sample of sediment (relative to 86Sr) is related to the amount of sediment which originated in the crust, as opposed to from the oceans.

The ratios of three major isotopes, 87Sr / 86Sr, 34S / 32S and 13C / 12C, undergo dramatic fluctuations around the beginning of the Cambrian.

Carbon isotopes

Carbon has 2 stable isotopes, carbon-12 (12C) and carbon-13 (13C). The ratio between the two is denoted , and represents a number of factors.

Causes often suggested for changes in the ratio of 13C to 12C found in rocks include:
 A mass extinction. Chemistry is largely driven by electro-magnetic forces, and lighter isotopes such as 12C respond to these more quickly than heavier ones such as 13C. So living organisms generally contain a disproportionate amount of 12C. A mass extinction would increase the amount of 12C available to be included in rocks and therefore reduce the ratio of 13C to 12C.
 A methane “burp”. In permafrosts and continental shelves methane produced by bacteria gets trapped in “cages” of water molecules, forming a mixture called a clathrate. This methane is very rich in 12C because it has been produced by organisms. Clathrates may dissociate (break up) suddenly if the temperature rises or the pressure on them drops. Such dissociations release the 12C-rich methane and thus reduce the ratio of 13C to 12C as this carbon is gradually incorporated into rocks (methane in the atmosphere breaks down into carbon dioxide and water; carbon dioxide reacts with minerals to form carbonate rocks).

Strontium isotopes

Please create this section

Sulfur isotopes

Please create this section

Other chemical fluctuations

Please create this section

References

Cambrian events
Evolution of the biosphere
Isotopes